The pale-breasted spinetail (Synallaxis albescens), is a passerine bird which breeds in the tropical New World from Costa Rica to Uruguay, and in Trinidad.
 
It is a member of the South American bird family Furnariidae, a group in which many species build elaborate clay nests, giving rise to the English name for the family of "ovenbirds".

However, the pale-breasted spinetail constructs a spherical stick nest with a 30 cm long tubular entrance low in a bush, into which its two greenish white eggs are laid. This species is a widespread and common resident breeder in a range of grassy and scrub habitats.

The pale-breasted spinetail is typically 16.5 cm long, and weighs 15 g. It is a slender bird with a medium long tail. The upperparts plumage is mainly pale brown, with darker wings and tail and rufous crown and shoulder patches. The throat and underparts are whitish with browner flanks.

Sexes are similar, but the race josephinae has grey on the forecrown, face sides and chest.

The pale-breasted spinetail is an insectivore which is difficult to see as it forages deep in thickets, but may be located by its buzzy repetitive wait'here song.

References

Further reading

External links
 Image - Animal Diversity Web

pale-breasted spinetail
Birds of Costa Rica
Birds of Panama
Birds of South America
pale-breasted spinetail